Voxan Motors is a motorcycle manufacturer founded in Issoire, France in 1995. The brand was particularly known for its 996 cc, 72° V-twin engine. Founded by Jacques Gardette, the project was to build the first French motorcycle company in the global market involving different partners. Alain Chevallier designed the chassis, while Sodemo Moteurs focused on the engine. The first prototype was shown in 1997, and the first production model released in 1999.

On 2 June 2010, the Monegasque company Venturi announced the purchase of the brand which had been in compulsory liquidation since December 2009. Its president Gildo Pallanca Pastor led Voxan in the same direction as Venturi by orienting it towards electric motorisation. In 2013, the Wattman, the first electric motorcycle developed in Monaco, was born.  In October 2020, the Wattman, in a new high-performance version, broke 11 world speed records with Italian motorcycle racer Max Biaggi on board.

History
Founded by Jacques Gardette in 1995, and financially backed by the Dassault Group in 1996, Voxan set out to become the first French motorcycle manufacturer in the modern era. In 1999, the first model, the limited production Roadster, was delivered to dealerships and sold exactly 50 units. The company then launched the Café Racer model in 2000, and the Scrambler model a year later. Although Voxan had garnered support for its products within France, the company continued to struggle against the established Japanese and Italian brands. In June 2002, Didier Cazeaux and Société de Développement et de Participation bought Voxan to ensure its continuity, and production restarted on April 1, 2003. The Street Scrambler model was released in 2003, and the Scrambler and Black Magic models in 2004.  Voxan opened its 23rd dealership, and its first in Luxembourg in May, 2005. In October, 2007, Voxan had an initial public offering on Euronext, with both Sodemo Moteurs, and Fortune Terres Luxembourg considering takeover bids.

On December 22, 2009, Voxan was forced into liquidation, and is now a subsidiary of the Monaco-based Venturi. Upon acquisition Voxan's manufacturing department ceased production, and its engineering staff were relocated to Venturi's headquarters in Fontvieille, Monaco. In June 2010, Venturi announced Voxan's new eco-friendly corporate plan, evolving the creation of an electric motorcycle by 2013.

Legacy models
 Roadster - the first model from this manufacturer, production beginning in 1999
 Cafe Racer
 Scrambler
 VB1
 Street Scrambler
 Black Magic
 Charade - based on the Black Magic
 1200 GTV - prototype presented at the salon de Paris 2007
 Starck Super-Naked (project abandoned)
 Black Classic - an evolution of the Black Magic
 VX10 - project code Nefertiti, 10th Voxan model, presented in May 2009

Wattman electric motorcycle

The Wattman is the brand's first electric model, released in 2013. Designed by Sacha Lakic, this electric motorcycle delivers a power of 150 kW (203 bhp) for an instantaneous torque of 200 Nm up to 10,500 rpm. At the time, it was the most powerful electric motorcycle ever built, capable of accelerating from 0 to 100 km/h in 3.4 s.

The Wattman has also been developed in a high performance version by the Voxan engineering team in Monaco. This version, also designed by Sacha Lakic, was conceived with the aim of breaking new world speed records. It is equipped with the same Mercedes electric motor that powers ROKiT Venturi Racing and Mercedes-Benz EQ Formula E Team in the Formula E World Championship.

World speed records 

Ridden by Max Biaggi, the Wattman set a new world speed record for an electric motorcycle in the 'partially streamlined electric motorcycle over 300 kilos' class, reaching 366.94 km/h.  The record was set on the last weekend of October 2020, at Châteauroux airfield in France. Further records were set at the Kennedy Space Center between 18 and 23 November 2021, including world record in the 'partially streamlined electric motorcycle under 300 kg' class.  The Voxan Wattman holds a total of 11 world speed records listed below:

– ¼ mile, flying start, partially streamlined:           394.45 km/h (245.10 mph) – no previous record

– ¼ mile, flying start, non-streamlined:                 357.19 km/h (221.95 mph) – no previous record

– 1 km, flying start, partially streamlined:              386.35 km/h (240.07 mph – previous record: 329.31 km/h (204.62 mph)

– 1 mile, flying start, partially streamlined:            366,94 km/h (228.05 mph) 
 previous record: 329,09 km/h (204 mph) 
 subsequently (Wattman, 2021) 455.74 km/h (283.18 mph)

– 1 mile, flying start, non-streamlined:                   349,38 km/h (217.10 mph) – previous: record 292 km/h (181.44 mph)

– ¼ mile, standing start, non-streamlined:            126.20 km/h (78.42 mph) – no previous record

– ¼ mile, standing start, partially streamlined:      127.30 km/h (79.10 mph) – previous record: 87.16 km/h (54.16 mph)

– 1 km, standing start, non-streamlined:               185.56 km/h (115.30 mph) – no previous record

– 1 km, standing start, partially streamlined:         191.84 km/h (119.20 mph)– previous record: 122.48 km/h (76.11 mph)

– 1 mile, standing start, non-streamlined:             222.82 km/h (138.45 mph) – no previous record

– 1 mile, standing start, partially streamlined:       225.01 km/h (139.81 mph) – no previous record

Models

Former models

References

External links

 Official website
 Philippe Starck-designed Voxan Super Naked XV Café Racer

Companies based in Auvergne-Rhône-Alpes
Motorcycle manufacturers of Monaco
French brands